Raja is a 2002 Indian Tamil-language romantic drama film directed by Ezhil which stars Ajith Kumar, Jyothika and Priyanka Trivedi. The film was released on 5 July 2002 and performed average at the box office.

Plot 
Raja is paranoid about getting married. Priya Mahalakshmi arrives at his place acting as his friend Madhi’s lover. However the truth comes to light and on confrontation, she reveals that her father plans to marry her off so she ran away from home and needs a place to stay. Raja obliges and she meets Raja’s parents, introducing herself as Raja’s lover. Raja’s parents become very happy and plan their marriage, without Raja knowing. On the day of the engagement, Raja gets infuriated and asks Priya to move out, throwing her bag. A photo gets dislodged and when Raja sees it, he gets shocked; it is Priya, who he loved.

In a flashback, it is seen that back in college, Raja was a writer and Priya was his die-hard fan. However, try as she might, she can never seem to meet him. One night when Raja performs a song on stage, she goes up to him to reveal her feelings. Under the cover of darkness Priya confesses her love for Raja. When the lights come back on, the other Priya, known as Thayir Saatham, is next to Raja and he believes that it was her who revealed his love. Priya finds out that Raja is staying as a tenant above Thayir Saatham’s house and uses her to get information about Raja. In this way, Thayir Saatham and Raja become close. In a parallel track, Bhavani, is Priya’s college mate who is a rowdy and lusts after Priya. Raja and Bhavani clash when Raja beats up Bhavani when he refused to compromise on the love between two people from different colleges. Bhavani loses face and swears revenge. Priya eventually reveals her feelings for Raja to Thayir Saatham, who feels bad and decides to avoid Raja until she can tell the truth to him. Raja, thinking that she is angry at him for not signing up for a computer class suggested by her father, goes early one morning to sign up for it. Thayir Saatham goes after him but is caught by Bhavani in a car. Bhavani attempts to rape her but she manages to lower the window and manages to see Raja, who chases after the car. Bhavani throws Thayir Saatham out of the car, killing her. Devastated, Raja keeps avoiding the topic of marriage, unable to forget her.

The truth revealed to everyone, Raja’s father requests him to forget the past and marry Priya, but Raja refuses and Priya waits for the train to leave back to her house. The train arrives and both her father and Bhavani are on it. When Raja sees Bhavani, he gets enraged and after fighting Bhavani’s goons, boards the train and bashes Bhavani, eventually killing him. Priya and Raja finally unite and the movie ends.

Cast 

Ajith Kumar as Raja
Jyothika as Priya
Priyanka Trivedi as Priya Mahalakshmi
Vadivelu as Sappai
Radha Ravi as Kathiresan
Livingston as Madhi
Vaiyapuri as Onan
Sonu Sood as Bhavani
Devan as Priya's father
Jyothi as Raja's mother
Madhan Bob as Priya Mahalakshmi's father
Nalini as Priya Mahalakshmi's mother
Mayilsamy as Drunk passenger
Theni Kunjarammal as Madhi's grandmother
Besant Ravi as Sumathi's relative
Chaplin Balu as Bus passenger
MLA Thangaraj as Madhi's father
Krishnamoorthy as Bus owner
Bava Lakshmanan as Bus owner
Kottachi as Bus passenger
Pasi Sathya as Priya's housemaid
Varalakshmi as Madhi's mother
Priyanka as Sumathi
Karnaa Radha
Vijay Ganesh
Mantra in a special appearance

Production 
Ezhil, Ajith Kumar and Jyothika reunited for the film following the success of Poovellam Un Vaasam (2001). The makers initially titled the film as Nallathor Kadhal Seivom, before considering Dileep and Jeeva, then finalising Raja. A fight scene was picturised on Ajith, Sonu and 40 stunt-men on a train that travelled from Mettupalayam to Ooty. For the scenes the train was hired for four days at a cost of about 40 lakh.

Soundtrack 
The film's music was composed by S. A. Rajkumar.

Reception 
Sify wrote "Ajit does only two types of movies these days. It is either action or soft romance mixed with comedy. His latest Raja, directed by Ezhil, falls into the second category. The film is out to wallop some fun, frolic and romance. The chemistry between the hi-energy Ajit and the soft-spoken ?apaavi? character of Priyanka Trivedi is laugh rising, but the plot subsequently degenerates into a farce". Malathi Rangarajan of The Hindu wrote "Ezhil is known for his decency in storyline and plausibility in direction. On these two fronts he does not disappoint much — it is the screenplay that seems wanting" and concluded "Raja"s recipe for success seems perfect — though the same cannot be said of the execution". Visual Dasan of Kalki wrote the makers have mixed light humour with an uncomplicated screenplay. Even though humour runs with the story but many of the scenes has smell of stale rice.

References

External links 
 

2000s Tamil-language films
2002 films
2002 romantic drama films
Films directed by Ezhil
Films scored by S. A. Rajkumar
Films shot in Ooty
Indian films about revenge
Indian romantic drama films